Hallucinations is David Usher's third studio album. It was released on September 9, 2003 via EMI label. Two singles, "Time of our Lives" and "Surfacing" were released off the record. Hallucinations follows two other solo albums, Little Songs (1998) and Morning Orbit (2001), and precedes a fourth solo album, If God Had Curves (2005). The album debuted at #6 on the Canadian Albums Chart, selling 6,300 copies in its first week. It is Usher's highest position on that chart of his solo career.

Track listing
"Hallucinations"
"I'm Coming Down"
"Numb"
"Time of our Lives"
"Devil by my Side"
"Message Home"
"In This Light"
"Surfacing"
"Tomorrow Comes"
"Tidal"
"Fearless"
"If You Tolerate This Your Children Will Be Next" (Manic Street Preachers)
"St. Lawrence River" (live)

Bonus Disk
"In This Light" (rock version)
"Butterfly" (live)
"Forestfire" (live)

Review

—Now Magazine

Singles

References

External links

2003 albums
David Usher albums
EMI Records albums
Albums recorded at Metalworks Studios